The 26th G8 summit was held in Nago, Okinawa Prefecture, Japan, on July 21–23, 2000.

Overview
The Group of Seven (G7) was an unofficial forum which brought together the heads of the richest industrialized countries: France, Germany, Italy, Japan, the United Kingdom, the United States, and Canada starting in 1976. The G8, meeting for the first time in 1997, was formed with the addition of Russia. In addition, the President of the European Commission has been formally included in summits since 1981. The summits were not meant to be linked formally with wider international institutions; and in fact, a mild rebellion against the stiff formality of other international meetings was a part of the genesis of cooperation between France's president Valéry Giscard d'Estaing and West Germany's chancellor Helmut Schmidt as they conceived the initial summit of the Group of Six (G6) in 1975.

The G8 summits during the 21st century have inspired widespread debates, protests, and demonstrations; and the two- or three-day event becomes more than the sum of its parts, elevating the participants, the issues, and the venue as focal points for activist pressure.

Ice hockey game: Canada vs. Japan
In conjunction with Kyushu-Okinawa summit, a Canadian team played the local Haebaru Dragonfires in a friendly. On July 21, the teams played the only ice rink on the island and in spite of above-35'C weather. About 4,500 Okinawan residents were in attendance and very keen ice hockey fans who are proud of their arena and their tradition of ice hockey in spite of being a remote tropical island. Canadian Prime Minister Jean Chrétien skated in the pre-game warm-up and performed the ceremonial puck drop. The Canadian team beat the Haebaru Dragonfires quite handily. Leading scorers were Andrew Donnelly, Canada (4 goals) and Paul Sabourin, Canada (3 goals). Following the game the teams engaged in a ceremonial jersey exchange. The mayor of Haebaru Town said "inviting the Prime Minister is a chance to strengthen the roots of ice hockey in Haebaru Town, while promoting stronger cross-cultural ties with Canada in the future."

Leaders at the summit

The 26th G8 summit was the first summit for Russian President Vladimir Putin, and was the last summit for Italian Prime Minister Giuliano Amato and US President Bill Clinton. It was also the first and only summit for Japanese Prime Minister Yoshirō Mori.

Participants
These summit participants were the current "core members" of the international forum:

Priorities

Traditionally, the host country of the G8 summit sets the agenda for negotiations, which take place primarily amongst multi-national civil servants in the weeks before the summit itself, leading to a joint declaration which all countries can agree to sign.

Issues
The summit was intended as a venue for resolving differences among its members. As a practical matter, the summit was also conceived as an opportunity for its members to give each other mutual encouragement in the face of difficult economic decisions.

Agenda
Global health was first introduced as an agenda at this G8 summit in 2000.

Business opportunity
For some, the G8 summit became a profit-generating event; as for example, the official G8 Summit magazines which have been published under the auspices of the host nations for distribution to all attendees since 1998.

A picture of Shureimon appears on the Japanese 2,000 yen note, released in 2000 in commemoration of the summit in Okinawa; and the Japanese government encountered criticism for having spent more than $750 million to hold this event.

Namie Amuro's song "Never End" was made for the summit.

Gallery

Notes

References
 Bayne, Nicholas and Robert D. Putnam. (2005).  Staying together: the G8 summit confronts the 21st century. Aldershot, Hampshire, England: Ashgate Publishing. ;  OCLC 217979297
 Reinalda, Bob and Bertjan Verbeek. (1998).  Autonomous Policy Making by International Organizations. London: Routledge.  ; ;   OCLC 39013643

External links

 No official website is created for any G7 summit prior to 1995 -- see the 21st G7 summit.
 Official prefectural website: Okinawa Summit 2000 Archives
 Japanese Prime Minister's Office (Kantei) website:  select summit photos
 Japanese Ministry of Foreign Affairs (MOFA) website: select summit documents
 University of Toronto: G8 Research Group, G8 Information Centre
  G8 2000, delegations & documents

G8 summit
G8 summit
G8 summit
G8 summit 2000
G8 summit 2000
2000
G8 summit 2000
July 2000 events in Asia